MV Esso Hamburg was a supply tanker ordered from Deutsche Werft Finkenwerder in 1939 for the Panama Transport Company as MV Esso Colon. Later in 1939 ownership was transferred to the Deutsch-Amerikanische Petroleum company and she was launched as Esso Hamburg on 9 October 1939.

Crew
The crew of the Esso Hamburg has a complement of 85 men, formed from: 
 1 Kriegsmarine officer and 10 Merchant Marine officers.
 7 Kriegsmarine petty officers.
 48 men of the Kriegsmarine and 21 Merchant Marine.

This was a relatively large complement of men in order to expedite the refueling of U-boats and surface ships.

Early history

In March 1940, Captain Braunwarth took command of the vessel.  In June 1940, she sailed with a cargo of fuel via the Kiel Canal to Bergen. After transferring oil to a submarine close to the Bergen shore, she ripped her hull on a reef. After trying to find a berth, she spent two months being repaired at Akers' yard in Oslo. In November 1940 she sailed back to Kiel, then to Rotterdam to get armaments fitted. These consisted of three French 75mm guns and three German 20mm guns. The Esso Hamburg was also fitted with a Direction finding (DF) device.  In late December 1940, she sailed for Cherbourg where her gun platforms were strengthened and additional fresh water tanks were added.

Atlantic sailing
Around 10 January 1941, Esso Hamburg left Cherbourg for the North Atlantic, taking a position south of Cape Farewell in Greenland. Esso Hamburg sailed north for approximately four weeks before encountering two cruisers. According to later prisoner statements, the ship remained in the area north of the Grand Banks of Newfoundland for over two months, where the cold was considered intense (as the crew lacked warm clothing). These prisoners stated that American patrol vessels capable of 20 knots were sighted and Esso Hamburg was fired on, leading Captain Braunwarth to think his ship was being followed. According to Captain Braunwarth (whose interrogation statements have been proven to be false or unreliable), he decided to return to port in St. Nazaire after the rudder was damaged in a storm. On 12 April, the ship returned to port, completing its first Atlantic voyage.

Supplies
The following supplies were taken on in St. Nazaire.

 7,400 tons of fuel oil - this was much less than the ship could hold but was sufficient for the ship to maintain the correct speed to complete the mission.  
 1,200 tons of Diesel oil for own consumption. 	 
 20 torpedoes in their crates. 	 
 2,000-3,000 tons of fresh water  
 300 tons of special boiler water. 	 
 2,500 20.5 cm shells. 	 
 Provisions for 2,000 men.

Last cruise
Esso Hamburg monitored the same frequencies that both ships used, so was able to keep track of their position, using the DF device. On the 24 May 1941 the Oberkommando der Marine ordered the ship to refuel Bismarck. Admiral Günther Lütjens disagreed with the order as the ship was being shadowed by two heavy cruisers. On 25 or 26 May, the captain was ordered to refuel Prinz Eugen on the 27 May. Prisoner statements confirm that the time of the rendezvous was 0545hours. On the 27th, Prinz Eugen was sighted at the location . Again as per standard operating procedure, Esso Hamburg tried to flee before Prinz Eugen overtook her and identified herself. According to the prisoners' statements, Prinz Eugen appeared undamaged.

Oiling started at 0700hours, with around 700 tons transferred and the operation completed at 1130hours, after which the Prinz Eugen sailed eastward. The Esso Hamburg remained in the area for 2 further days waiting for orders to refuel other warships, but none came. After the two days passed and having received no orders, the ship sailed south between the 30th and 32nd meridian to what the captain stated was a safer area.

On 4 June 1941, while on the move to meet the tanker Egerland, Esso Hamburg took fire from the heavy cruiser  and the destroyer  at location . At 1400hours, the ship was scuttled by her crew. Eighty-seven crew members were captured and transported to HMS London.

References

1939 ships